San Agustín Mixtepec Zapotec is a nearly extinct Zapotec language of Oaxaca, Mexico.

References

Zapotec languages